Duplicaria bernardii is a species of sea snail, a marine gastropod mollusk in the family Terebridae, the auger snails.

Description

Distribution
Australia, New South Wales, Trial Bay (Hedley, 1912)

References

 Deshayes G.P. (1857). Description d'especes nouvelles du genre Terebra. Journal de Conchyliologie. 6: 65–102
 Terryn, Y. (2007). Terebridae: A Collectors Guide. Conchbooks & Natural Art. 59pp + plates

External links
 Hedley, C. (1912). Descriptions of some new or noteworthy shells in the Australian Museum. Records of the Australian Museum. 8(3): 131–160, pls 40–45
 Fedosov, A. E.; Malcolm, G.; Terryn, Y.; Gorson, J.; Modica, M. V.; Holford, M.; Puillandre, N. (2020). Phylogenetic classification of the family Terebridae (Neogastropoda: Conoidea). Journal of Molluscan Studies

Terebridae
Gastropods described in 1857